The 2021 Wartburg Knights football team represented Wartburg College as a member of the American Rivers Conference (ARC) during the 2021 NCAA Division III football season. Led by first-year head coach Chris Winter, the Knights compiled an overall record of 7–3 with a mark of 6–2 in conference play, placing second in the ARC. The team played home games at Walston-Hoover Stadium in Waverly, Iowa.

Schedule

References

Wartburg
Wartburg Knights football seasons
Wartburg Knights football